SN 2005gl was a supernova in the barred-spiral galaxy NGC 266. It was discovered using CCD frames taken October 5, 2005, from the 60 cm automated telescope at the Puckett Observatory in Georgia, US, and reported by Tim Puckett in collaboration with Peter Ceravolo. It was independently identified by Yasuo Sano in Japan.
The supernova was located 29.8″ east and
16.7″ north of the galactic core. Based upon its spectrum, this was classified as a Type IIn core-collapse supernova. It has a redshift of z = 0.016, which is the same as the host galaxy.

Using archived images from the Hubble Space Telescope, a candidate progenitor star was identified. This is believed to have been a luminous blue variable (LBV), similar to Eta Carinae, with an absolute magnitude of −10.3 and a surface temperature of about 13,000 K. There was a small probability that the source was instead located in a compact cluster of stars, but the association with the LBV has since been reliably established.

References

External links
 Light curves and spectra on the Open Supernova Catalog
 
 

Supernovae
Luminous blue variables
Pisces (constellation)